Life Is Beautiful is a 2014 Bollywood film that was directed by Manoj Amarnani, who also starred in the movie. The film was released in India on 22 August 2014 and stars Nancy Brunetta as Amarnani's co-star.

Synopsis 

Raj works in Toronto on a temporary visa and is living with his friend Prem, who resents Raj for invading what little living space he has. When Raj's application for permanent residency in Canada is denied, he decides to marry a complete stranger in hopes of getting approved. The woman, Pia, finds that she has to move in with Raj to make everything look legitimate, but as time passes the two find themselves becoming friends. However all of Raj's plans are potentially ruined when he meets Linda, a woman who makes him doubt his previous actions.

Cast 

 Manoj Amarnani for Raj
 Nancy Brunetta for Linda
 Anokhi Dalvi for Pia
 Parth Naik for Prem
 Master Aaryan for Rahul
 Jayiesh Singh for Rohit
 Sunaina Verma for Meghina
 Arjun Jasuja for Keswani
 Shaibal Datta for Jai
 Munish Kumar Joshi
 Kuldip Kumar Joshi

Singers

Reception 
The Times of India rated the film at 2 stars, writing "Actor Manoj Amarnani juggles the multiple roles of director, background score composer, choreographer and stylist for the film. He dabbles in almost everything and in spite of being a newcomer, manages to make a film that is watchable if not memorable."

References

External links 

 
 

2010s Hindi-language films
2014 films